Lara K. Mahal is an American chemist who is the Canada Excellence Research Chair in Glycomics at the University of Alberta in Edmonton, Alberta, Canada. She is also a Professor of Chemistry at the University of Alberta. She is notable both for her pioneering work establishing lectin microarrays as a new technology for glycomics, her work on miRNA regulation of glycosylation  and her graduate work with Carolyn R. Bertozzi on unnatural carbohydrate incorporation. Work in her laboratory focuses on understanding the role of carbohydrates in human health using systems- and chemical biology-based approaches

Academia
Mahal received her B.A. in Chemistry at the University of California, Santa Cruz in 1995. As an undergraduate, she worked on organic free radical chemistry in the laboratory of Professor Rebecca Braslau. In 1995, Professor Mahal joined the newly formed laboratory of Professor Bertozzi at the University of California, Berkeley where she worked on the incorporation of unnatural functionalized sialic acid derivatives onto the surface of cells. For this landmark work, Professor Mahal was awarded and American Chemical Society Medicinal Chemistry Pre-doctoral Fellowship. After graduating in 2001, Professor Mahal did postdoctoral research on neuronal exocytosis in the laboratory of Professor Jim Rothman at Memorial Sloan-Kettering Cancer Research Center. During this time Professor Mahal was a Jane Coffins Child Cancer Research Fellow.

In 2003, Mahal joined the faculty of the University of Texas at Austin as an Assistant Professor of Chemistry and Biochemistry. Tenured in 2009, she then joined the faculty of New York University as an Associate Professor of Chemistry in the Biomedical Chemistry Institute. She was promoted to Professor in 2016. In 2019, Mahal became the Canada Excellence Research Chair in Glycomics at the University of Alberta.  Beyond the CERC, Mahal has received several major awards, including the Beckman Young Investigators Award (2004), an NSF Career Award (2007), the Sloan Foundation Fellowship (2008), the 2008 NIH Director's New Innovator Award and the Horace S. Isbell Award in Carbohydrate Chemistry (2017).

References

External links
 http://www.glycocode.org

Living people
Year of birth missing (living people)
University of Texas at Austin faculty
University of California, Santa Cruz alumni
University of California, Berkeley alumni
New York University faculty